Evan Pateshall (born Evan Thomas; December 1817 – 9 April 1885) was a Conservative Party politician.

Personal life
Pateshall was born as Evan Thomas in December 1817 to David Thomas of Radnorshire. He was educated at Shrewsbury School and King's College London. He married Anne Elizabeth Pateshall, only child of William Pateshall, in 1842 and changed his surname to Pateshall in 1855. He lived at Allensmore Court in Allensmore, Herefordshire.

Political career 
Pateshall was Mayor of Hereford in 1863, before being elected Conservative MP for Hereford constituency in 1874. He then  resigned after four years in 1878.

Other activities 
During his life, Pateshall was a Justice of the Peace, a Deputy Lieutenant for each of Herefordshire, Brecon and Radnor, and commanded one of the companies of the Hereford Rifle Volunteers.

References

External links
 

1817 births
1885 deaths
Herefordshire Light Infantry officers
People educated at Shrewsbury School
Alumni of King's College London
Conservative Party (UK) MPs for English constituencies
UK MPs 1874–1880
Deputy Lieutenants of Bedfordshire
Deputy Lieutenants in Wales